Wang Yang (born 9 July 1993) is a Chinese sailor. He competed in the men's 470 event at the 2020 Summer Olympics.

References

1993 births
Living people
Sailors at the 2020 Summer Olympics – 470
Chinese male sailors (sport)
Olympic sailors of China